Yoon Hong-seung (born 1975), who also goes by the pseudonym Chang, is a South Korean film director and screenwriter. A former music video director, Chang debuted with the Korean horror film Death Bell in 2008. His second feature The Target (2014) - a remake of the 2010 French film Point Blank, won the Golden Goblet Award at the Shanghai International Film Festival, and was also invited to the Cannes Film Festival and Busan International Film Festival in 2014.

Filmography 
Death Bell (2008) - director, screenwriter
Sydney in Love (short film, 2009) - director
Lucid Dreaming (short film, 2012) - director
48M (2013) - staff
The Target (2014) - director
Canola (2016) - director
Reset (2017)

References

External links 
 
 

1975 births
Living people
South Korean film directors
South Korean screenwriters